Walde is a surname. Notable people with the surname include:

 Alfons Walde (1891–1958), Austrian painter
 Alois Walde (1869–1924), German linguist
 Arve Walde (born 1985), Norwegian footballer
 Werner Walde (born 1926), German politician (DDR)

See also
 Wald (disambiguation)